In the Mouth of Madness is a 1994 horror film directed by John Carpenter.

In the Mouth of Madness may also refer to:
 In the Mouth of Madness (soundtrack), 1995 soundtrack album for the film, and the title song
 In the Mouth of Madness (Luni Coleone album), a 2001 album by Luni Coleone

See also
 The Mouths of Madness, a 2013 album by Orchid
 At the Mountains of Madness (disambiguation)